Superfluous People (German:Überflüssige Menschen) is a 1926 German silent film directed by Aleksandr Razumny and starring Eugen Klöpfer, Camilla von Hollay and Heinrich George. It was made by Prometheus-Film which was affiliated to the German Communist Party and the Moscow-based Mezhrabpomfilm.

The film's sets were designed by the art directors Andrej Andrejew and Stefan Lhotka.

Cast
 Eugen Klöpfer as Andrej Karlowitsch Siganew  
 Camilla von Hollay as Dunja Siganewa  
 Heinrich George as Balagula  
 Albert Steinrück as Bronsa  
 Vera Pawlowa as Marfa  
 Bruno Arno as Mendel Rothschild  
 Fritz Rasp as Chirikov  
 Emil Lind as Schachkes  
 Werner Krauss as Ortspolizist Suka  
 Philipp Manning as Bürgermeister Duboff 
 Hedwig Wangel as Duboffs Frau  
 Elza Temary as Ola, beider Tochter  
 Illo Gutschwager as Wanja, beider Sohn  
 Hans Brausewetter as Lukin  
 Wilhelm Diegelmann as Brandmeister  
 Fritz Kampers as Ben Span  
 Jaro Fürth as Arzt  
 Nikolai Malikoff as Bader  
 Vera Sacharowa as Verlobungsgast  
 Harry Nestor 
 Clementine Plessner 
 Sylvia Torf

References

Bibliography
 Murray, Bruce Arthur. Film and the German Left in the Weimar Republic: From Caligari to Kuhle Wampe. University of Texas Press, 1990.

External links

1926 films
Films of the Weimar Republic
Films directed by Aleksandr Razumnyj
German silent feature films
German black-and-white films